Malinovka is a rural locality (a village) in Petropavlovskoye Rural Settlement, Bolshesosnovsky District, Perm Krai, Russia. The population was 15 as of 2010. There is 1 street.

References 

Rural localities in Bolshesosnovsky District